Kids Helpline is a free Australian telephone and online counselling service for young people aged between 5 and 25. Counsellors respond to more than 6,000 calls each week about issues ranging from relationship breakdown and bullying to sexual abuse, homelessness, suicidal thoughts, depression and drug and alcohol usage.

Funding 
The service is primarily funded by yourtown, an Australian youth community services organisation, which provides the Kids Helpline service. Supported by the Australian Government (through the Department of Health and Aged Care and the Australian Human Rights Commission), the Queensland Government, and Government of Western Australia. It is also supported by corporate sponsors, Optus, Bupa, Future Generation Investment Company, and First National Real Estate.

Counselling methods 
All counsellors that provide services through Kids Helpline are university-qualified and are formal employees of yourtown.

 Phone Counselling. Free counselling over the phone available 24 hours a day, 7 days a week on 1800 55 1800. The service is a freecall number from all mobiles on Australian carriers, landlines and public payphones.
 Online Counselling. Called 'WebChat', Kids Helpline counselling is also available online through the website. This service is available 24 hours a day, 7 days a week. Generally, this service has high wait times, ranging up to 50 minutes during peak times in evenings.
 Email Counselling. Kids Helpline also provides email counselling through counsellor@kidshelpline.com.au. The inbox is answered from 8am to 10pm daily, with response times often being within a few days.

Long-term users of the service can also access case management through Kids Helpline, as well as "wrap around care" where a trusted adult is involved in ensuring a child's welfare. Kids Helpline can also refer patients onwards to more formal and in-person services.

See also
Crisis hotline
List of suicide crisis lines
Lifeline (crisis support service)
Beyond Blue

References

External links

Child-related organisations in Australia
Crisis hotlines